The 2021–22 Seattle Redhawks men's basketball team represented Seattle University during the 2021–22 NCAA Division I men's basketball season. The Redhawks, led by first-year head coach Chris Victor, competed as members of the Western Athletic Conference. They played their home games at the on-campus Redhawk Center and the recently renovated Climate Pledge Arena.

Previous season
The Redhawks finished the 2020–21 season 12–11, 4–5 WAC play to finish in fifth place. They defeated California Baptist in the quarterfinals of the WAC tournament before losing to Grand Canyon in the semifinals.

Offseason

Departures

Incoming transfers

Recruiting class of 2021

Roster

Schedule and results

|-
!colspan=9 style=| Non-conference regular season

|-
!colspan=9 style=| WAC regular season

 

|-
!colspan=9 style=|WAC tournament

Source

See also 
2021–22 Seattle Redhawks women's basketball team

References

Seattle Redhawks men's basketball seasons
Seattle Redhawks
Seattle Redhawks
Seattle